Clarence Alphonse Gagnon,   LL. D. (November 8, 1881 – January 5, 1942) was a French Canadian painter, draughtsman, engraver and illustrator.  He is known for his landscape paintings of the Laurentians and the Charlevoix region of eastern Quebec.

Early years and training
Clarence Alphonse Gagnon was born in Montreal, Quebec on November 8, 1881. He was the son of Alphonse E. Gagnon, a milling manager, and a cultured English mother, who was interested in literature.  Part of his childhood was spent in Sainte Rose, a village north of Montreal. Early in life, his mother had encouraged him to learn drawing and painting, but his father wanted him to become a businessman.

He studied with William Brymner at the Art Association of Montreal in 1897, the same year that Brymner delivered a lecture on Impressionism at the school. Brymner, as he did with many of his students, encouraged Gagnon to study in Paris, and with the financial support of a wealthy patron, James Morgan, Gagnon enrolled at the Académie Julian in 1904, where he studied with Jean-Paul Laurens. While there, he painted the French countryside and the beaches at Saint-Malo, Dinan, and Dinard, lightening his colour palette and recording the effects of light.

Gagnon showed his early promise by winning a bronze medal at the Canadian exhibition at the Louisiana Purchase Exposition in 1904. While in Paris, Gagnon developed a friendship with James Wilson Morrice. Before returning to Canada in the autumn of 1907, he travelled to Spain, Italy, England, and Norway making sketches for paintings and prints. During this period he also established an international reputation as an etcher.

Career
In 1907, Gagnon returned to Canada, and settled in the Baie-Saint-Paul region of Charlevoix. In 1913, his career hit a turning point, with the first and only major solo exhibition of his work, mostly winter landscapes from Quebec, at the Galerie A. M. Reitlinger in Paris, Clarence A. Gagnon. Paysage d’hiver dans les montagnes des Laurentides au Canada (1913). This exhibition, the first for a living Canadian artist in Paris, marked him as a painter with his own interpretation of the Canadian winter and also as a painter known for his views of habitant life. Later he travelled to Venice, Rouen, Saint-Malo and the Laurentians in Quebec to paint landscape. He was also an illustrator and illustrated Louis-Frédéric Rouquette's Le Grand silence blanc in 1929 and in 1933, Maria Chapdelaine by Louis Hémon.

His paintings and etchings are held in many collections across Canada, including the National Gallery of Canada in Ottawa, the Art Gallery of Ontario in Toronto, the McMichael Canadian Art Collection in Kleinburg, Ontario, Montreal Museum of Fine Arts, the Musée National des Beaux-Arts du Québec in Quebec City, the Art Gallery of Alberta in Edmonton, the New Brunswick Museum in Saint John, Art Gallery of Windsor, the Art Gallery of Guelph, the Robert McLaughlin Gallery in Oshawa, and the Vancouver Art Gallery. Gagnon's work is also owned by collections outside Canada, including in England the Victoria and Albert Museum in London, the Walker Art Gallery in Liverpool, and the Manchester Art Gallery, in Argentina at the Fundación Proa in Buenos Aires and in France the Petit Palais in Paris. He was a member of the Canadian Art Club and in 1922, the Royal Canadian Academy of Arts. In 1923, he received the Trevor Prize of the Salmagundi Club of New York. 

Gagnon lived in France from 1917 to 1919 and from 1924 to 1936. He returned permanently to Canada in 1936, returning to his native Montreal, where he died on January 5, 1942, at the Royal Victoria Hospital. He is buried at the Notre-Dame-des-Neiges Cemetery in Montreal. A bust has been erected in his memory by the Galerie Clarence Gagnon in Quebec City.

Personal life
In 1919 Gagnon married Lucile Rodier, also a pupil of Brymner. One of his disciples was the painter René Richard.

References

Further reading

External links
 
 Clarence Gagnon biography page at National Gallery of Canada
 
 Clarence Gagnon, Canadian Artists Series, Albert H. Robson, The Ryerson Press, Retrieved January 24, 2016

1881 births
1942 deaths
20th-century Canadian painters
Canadian male painters
Académie Julian alumni
Artists from Montreal
Members of the Royal Canadian Academy of Arts
Persons of National Historic Significance (Canada)
Burials at Notre Dame des Neiges Cemetery
Canadian Impressionist painters
20th-century Canadian male artists